We Got a Love is the second studio album by Irish musician and producer Shit Robot. It was released on 18 March 2014 under DFA Records.

Critical reception
We Got a Love was met with generally favorable reviews from critics. At Metacritic, which assigns a weighted average rating out of 100 to reviews from mainstream publications, this release received an average score of 67, based on 11 reviews

Track listing

References

2014 albums
DFA Records albums